Zdeněk Kalista (1900–1982) was a Czechoslovak historian, poet, literary critic, and editor.

Czechoslovak poets
1900 births
1982 deaths
Recipients of the Order of Tomáš Garrigue Masaryk
Czechoslovak historians
Czechoslovak editors
Czechoslovak literary critics